Darren William Bragg (born September 7, 1969) is an American former baseball outfielder who played 11 seasons in Major League Baseball (MLB). He played for the Seattle Mariners (–), Boston Red Sox (1996–), St. Louis Cardinals (1999), Colorado Rockies, New York Mets, New York Yankees (2001), Atlanta Braves (–), San Diego Padres, and his final team, the Cincinnati Reds (2004).

Career
Bragg attended Georgia Tech, and in 1989 he played collegiate summer baseball with the Cotuit Kettleers of the Cape Cod Baseball League. He was selected by the Mariners in the 22nd round of the 1991 MLB Draft.

In his career, he hit .255 with 46 home runs, 260 RBI, and 56 stolen bases.

His most notable time in the majors came after he was traded to the Boston Red Sox by the Seattle Mariners for Jamie Moyer and immediately excelled in his new environment. For the second half of 1996, Bragg started in center field, deposing Lee Tinsley, a future coach for the Seattle Mariners, Bragg's former team. He continued his strong play and started almost every day for the Red Sox throughout , despite the previous winter's signing of Shane Mack. The following year, he fell into a platoon arrangement with Darren Lewis and Damon Buford between right and center field. He was subsequently released by the Red Sox and became a notorious journeyman, receiving the most playing time with the St. Louis Cardinals and Atlanta Braves.

On November 3, the Dayton Dragons, the Single-A affiliate of the Cincinnati Reds named Bragg the team's hitting coach for the  season. Bragg returned to the Dragons as the development coach in 2021.

Bragg now heads a company called "The Hit Club" in Thomaston, Connecticut. There, he works with many kids and high schoolers on hitting. He also heads a company called "Thrive Sports and Fitness" in Middlebury, Connecticut.

Personal life
Bragg is currently residing in Southbury, Connecticut with three children.

References

External links

Retrosheet
Pura Pelota Venezuelan Professional Baseball League statistics

1969 births
Living people
American expatriate baseball players in Canada
Atlanta Braves players
Baseball players from Connecticut
Boston Red Sox players
Calgary Cannons players
Caribes de Oriente players
American expatriate baseball players in Venezuela
Cincinnati Reds players
Colorado Rockies players
Columbus Clippers players
Cotuit Kettleers players
Georgia Tech Yellow Jackets baseball players
Jacksonville Suns players
Louisville Bats managers
Louisville Bats players
Major League Baseball outfielders
Nashua Pride players
New York Mets players
New York Yankees players
Norfolk Tides players
Peninsula Pilots players
Richmond Braves players
San Diego Padres players
Seattle Mariners players
Sportspeople from Waterbury, Connecticut
St. Louis Cardinals players
Tacoma Rainiers players
Taft School alumni